Alphonse Gourd (7 September 1850 - 23 December 1925) was a French politician belonging to the Republican Federation.

Gourd was born in New York City.  He was a member of the Chamber of Deputies from 1898 to 1924.

References

External links
 

1850 births
1925 deaths
Politicians from New York City
Republican Federation politicians
Members of the 7th Chamber of Deputies of the French Third Republic
Members of the 8th Chamber of Deputies of the French Third Republic
Members of the 9th Chamber of Deputies of the French Third Republic
Members of the 10th Chamber of Deputies of the French Third Republic
Members of the 11th Chamber of Deputies of the French Third Republic
Members of the 12th Chamber of Deputies of the French Third Republic